KRTK (93.3 FM) is a commercial radio station in Hermann, Missouri, broadcasting to the western suburbs of the Saint Louis, Missouri, area.

They are one local affiliate for The Dan Bongino Show and The Ben Shapiro Show, while also featuring local radio personalities.

History
KRTK began in Steelville, Missouri in 1985 as KNSX on 96.7 MHz, with a power of 3,000 watts. In 1996, the station completed an upgrade to a Class C2 facility, giving it a signal covering a wide area of Eastern and Central, Missouri. In 2007, KNSX changed its call letters to KQQX, and in 2011, they received authorization from the Federal Communications Commission (FCC) to change their city of license from Steelville to Hermann, Missouri, and move their tower closer to the St. Louis Metropolitan area, and upgrade output power to a full 50,000 watts.

The FCC reported on August 14, 2017, that the station had changed its call sign to WLUQ, although all evidence of this change was removed from the FCC's records on September 5, 2017. However, the station did change its call sign to KLUQ on September 8, 2017.

KLUQ was in receivership after being repossessed from Twenty One Sound Communications, which was wholly owned by Randy Wachter, who founded the station. KLUQ was running on a Special Temporary Authority at a power of 1,000 Watts from a tower near Warrenton, Missouri and was simulcasting Americana music programming from KWUL 101.7 in Elsberry, Missouri. From 2017 to January 2019, it aired a format of hard Christian rock music. From 1996 to 2016, the station aired a successful alternative Rock format under the KNSX and later KQQX call letters as "93X"

In 2016, KLUQ changed to Americana formatted ‘K-WOLF’. With sister stations: KVMO and KWUL.

On July 14, 2021, KLUQ changed callsigns to KRTK and began to air conservative talk formatted ‘RealTalk 93.3’, with sister station KVMO. KWUL continued to broadcast Americana ‘K-WOLF’.

With the expansion of "Real Talk" to other frequencies, in November 2021, the group of stations were called "The Real Talk Radio Network."

Digital broadcast
KNSX was one of the first FM stations that was digitally automated with no live DJs. The station also was a pioneer under Randy Wachter's ownership with webcasting a live feed online via Real Audio, of which KNSX was among the top 10 most-listened-to webstreams in 1997–1998.

External links

RTK (FM)
Radio stations established in 1985
1985 establishments in Missouri
Conservative talk radio